This is a list of properties and districts in Brooks County, Georgia that are listed on the National Register of Historic Places (NRHP).

Current listings

|}

References

Brooks
Brooks County, Georgia
National Register of Historic Places in Brooks County, Georgia